This is a list of airports in Uganda, sorted by location.

Uganda is a landlocked country in East Africa. It is bordered on the east by Kenya, on the north by South Sudan, on the west by the Democratic Republic of the Congo, on the southwest by Rwanda, and on the south by Tanzania. The southern part of the country includes a substantial portion of Lake Victoria, which is also bordered by Kenya and Tanzania. Uganda's capital and largest city is Kampala.



Airports 

Names shown in bold indicate the airport has scheduled passenger service on commercial airlines. These include Entebbe International Airport, plus three domestic airports where Kampala-based Eagle Air provides service: Arua Airport, Gulu Airport, and Moyo Airport.

See also 

 Transport in Uganda
 List of airports by ICAO code: H#HU - Uganda
 Wikipedia: WikiProject Aviation/Airline destination lists: Africa#Uganda

References 

 Great Circle Mapper: Airports in Uganda - IATA and ICAO codes, coordinates, elevation, runway length
 
  - includes IATA codes

External links
 Uganda eyes May 2019 to get funds for domestic flights infrastructure
 Uganda's Second International Airport In the Pipeline
 Arua Airport, Gulu Airport & Kasese Airport Awaiting Upgrade To International Standards

Uganda
 
Airports
Airlines
Uganda